Sinnappah Arasaratnam (20 March 1930 – 4 October 1998) was a Sri Lankan academic, historian and author, born during British colonial rule. Known as 'Arasa', he was a lecturer at the University of Ceylon, University of Malaya and  University of New England (Australia).

Early life and family
Arasaratnam was born on 20 March 1930 in Navaly in Northern Province of British Ceylon. He was educated at Jaffna College, Vaddukoddai. After school he joined the University of Ceylon in 1947 from where he graduated in 1951 with a First Class Honours BA degree.

Arasaratnam married Thanalakshmi (Padma), daughter of Selvathurai. They had two daughters (Sulochana and Ranjana) and a son (Niranjan). They have 7 grandchildren, 2 granddaughters (Meera and Lily) and 5 grandsons (Rohan, Isaia, Arasa, Eamonn, and Aron). Arasaratnam was a practising Christian who attended the Uniting Church in Armidale, New South Wales.

Career
After graduation in 1951 Arasaratnam was appointed an assistant lecturer of history at the University of Ceylon. In 1954 he joined the University of London to carry out doctoral research and in 1956 he graduated with a Ph.D in history. On returning to Ceylon Arasaratnam rejoined the University of Ceylon as a lecturer. He was appointed lecturer in Indian Studies at the University of Malaya in 1961. He was promoted to professor of history in 1968.

Arasaratnam was appointed second professor in the Department of History at the University of New England (Australia) in 1972. He took up the post in 1973. He held the Smuts Fellowship in Commonwealth Studies, Cambridge in 1977. Arasaratnam retired from the University of New England in March 1995.

Death
Arasaratnam died suddenly in Sydney, Australia on 4 October 1998. He was 68.

Works
Arasaratnam was prolific writer — he wrote 15 books and 93 articles/chapters. His literary works were achieved while heavily engaged with activities such as sitting on key bodies such as the Academic Advisory Committee.

 Dutch Power in Ceylon, 1658-1687 (1958, Netherlands Institute of Cultural Relations/Djambatan)
 Ceylon (1964, Spectrum/Prentice-Hall)
 Indian festivals in Malaya (1966, University of Malaya) 

 Maritime India in the seventeenth century (1994, Oxford University Press)
 Ceylon and the Dutch, 1600-1800 (1996, Variorum)
 Maritime commerce and English power (1996, Variorum)

References

1930 births
1998 deaths
Academic staff of the University of Ceylon
Academic staff of the University of Malaya
Alumni of Jaffna College
Alumni of the University of Ceylon
Alumni of the University of London
Australian people of Sri Lankan Tamil descent
People from Northern Province, Sri Lanka
Sri Lankan Tamil academics
Sri Lankan Tamil writers
Academic staff of the University of New England (Australia)
Historians of the Dutch East India Company